Hartley is an unincorporated community in Haakon County, in the U.S. state of South Dakota.

History
A post office called Hartley was established in 1908, and remained in operation until 1948. The community took its name from Hartley, Iowa, the native home of a first settler.

References

Unincorporated communities in Haakon County, South Dakota
Unincorporated communities in South Dakota